

Dudd was a medieval Bishop of Winchester. He was consecrated no earlier than 781 and was dead by 785.

Citations

References

External links

Bishops of Winchester
8th-century English bishops
780s deaths
Year of birth unknown
Year of death uncertain